Rocquencourt is a former commune in the Yvelines department in the Île-de-France in north-central France. On 1 January 2019, it was merged into the new commune Le Chesnay-Rocquencourt.

The commune is mainly known as the location of a research unit of INRIA (in the Domaine de Voluceau, formerly Camp Voluceau, used by SHAPE) as well as a freeway exchange known as the Rocquencourt Triangle (triangle de Rocquencourt, junction of the A12 autoroute and the A13 autoroute), which is often mentioned in traffic news.

History
On 1 July 1815, Napoleon's Grande Armée fought its last battle in Rocquencourt and Le Chesnay.  After the defeat of Waterloo on 18 June 1815, Grouchy's army withdrew to Paris via Namur and Dinant, reaching Paris on 29 June, a few days before the Prussians, who camped at Versailles.

While negotiating the final armistice, Exelmans was ordered to attack the Prussians at Versailles on 1 July 1815. Under attack the Prussians retreated from Versailles and headed east, but were blocked by the French at Vélizy.  They failed to re-enter Versailles and headed for Saint-Germain-en-Laye.  Their first squadron came under fire at the entrance of Rocquencourt and attempted to escape through the fields.  They were forced into a small, narrow street in Le Chesnay and killed or captured.  However, the main body of the Prussian army succeeded in reaching Saint-Germain. (From Presentation of Rocquencourt.)

Points of interest
 Arboretum de Chèvreloup

See also
Communes of the Yvelines department

References

External links

 Rocquencourt city council website (in French)

Former communes of Yvelines
Populated places disestablished in 2019